TV3+ is a Danish pay television channel owned by Viaplay Group. It has its origins in the youth-oriented channel ZTV and women-focused channel TV6 that were launched in the mid-1990s when Kinnevik invested heavily in new free-to-air channels. In April 1996, Danish ZTV was closed down along with Sportskanalen, and TV6 was replaced by a new channel called 3+. In the beginning, 3+ time-shared with TVG in the mornings, ZTV in the afternoon and Sportskanalen in the weekend, but eventually these channels closed down.

Television series

TV3+'s programming includes most notably sitcoms:
8 Simple Rules
American Dad!
Family Guy
Family Ties
Full House
How I Met Your Mother
Kath & Kim
King of the Hill
Married... with Children
My Boys
Listen Up!
Less than Perfect moved to Kanal 5
Scrubs
Seinfeld
The Drew Carey Show
The Hughleys
The Jamie Foxx Show
The Simpsons

Dramas like
Cold Case
Bones
Dexter
Knight Rider
Miami Vice
NCIS
Over There
Southland
Supernatural

Documentary/reality shows like
An Idiot Abroad
Criss Angel Mindfreak
Deadliest Catch
Family Business
Guinea Pig
Miami Ink
Ninja Warrior
Politistationen
Speed
Survivor: The Australian Outback
Top Gear
Urban Legends

The channel will however broadcast some movies.

On 2 February 2010 a HD-version of the channel, started broadcasting.

References

External links
Official Site

TV3+ Denmark
Television stations in Denmark
Television channels and stations established in 1995
Television channels and stations established in 1996